John Lynch fitz Andrew, Mayor of Galway, September 1528-September 1529. Lynch was the son of Andrew Lynch (Mayor 1498-99) and Eleanor Martin. He had a brother, Arthur Lynch fitz Andrew, who served as Mayor from 1539-40. During his term, laws were introduced which forbade a number of forms of gambling, such as dice, cards, aimed especially against apprentices and members of the Gaelic community. Those found guilty would pay twenty shillings.

Lynch married his kinswoman, Redish Lynch, by whom he had at least one son, Dominick Lynch fitz John, who served as Mayor 1548-49.

See also

 Mayor of Galway
 The Tribes of Galway

References
History of Galway, James Hardiman, Galway, 1820.
Old Galway, Maureen Donovan O'Sullivan, 1942.
Henry, William (2002). Role of Honour: The Mayors of Galway City 1485-2001. Galway: Galway City Council.  
 Martyn, Adrian (2016). The Tribes of Galway: 1124-1642

Politicians from County Galway
Mayors of Galway
Year of death unknown
Year of birth unknown
16th-century Irish businesspeople